Tangry is a commune in the Pas-de-Calais department in the Hauts-de-France region of France.
 
Tangry lies 36 km northwest of Arras, at the junction of the D70, D77 and D99 roads.

Main sights
 The church of St.Omer, dating from the sixteenth century.

See also
Communes of the Pas-de-Calais department

References

Communes of Pas-de-Calais